Calling Bulldog Drummond is a 1951 British crime film directed by Victor Saville and featuring Walter Pidgeon, Margaret Leighton, Robert Beatty, David Tomlinson and Bernard Lee. It featured the character Bulldog Drummond created by the novelist Herman Cyril McNeile, which had seen a number of screen adaptations. A novel tie-in was also released in 1951. It was made by the British subsidiary of MGM at Elstree Studios. The film's sets were designed by the art director Alfred Junge.

Drummond is called out of retirement by Scotland Yard to infiltrate a ruthless London crime outfit.

Plot
After three robberies are pulled off with military precision, Inspector McIver (Charles Victor) asks Hugh "Bulldog" Drummond (Walter Pidgeon) to give Scotland Yard a hand. As an ex-officer, Drummond knows how the suspected military mastermind would think. He agrees, though he very reluctantly accepts Sergeant Helen Smith (Margaret Leighton) of Special Branch as his partner, believing that women are not cut out for that sort of undercover work.

Drummond arranges to get caught cheating at poker at his London club so he can drop out of sight. Smith causes a minor car accident involving Arthur Gunns (Robert Beatty), suspected of being in the gang. Gunns' attraction to Smith and carefully planted evidence showing "Joe Crandall" and "Lily Ross" to be criminals themselves enables the pair to infiltrate the gang.

Drummond's friend Algernon Longworth (David Tomlinson), who has been kept in the dark about the whole matter, becomes convinced that all is not what it seems. He telephones Colonel Webson (Bernard Lee), a member of Drummond's club, to get him to postpone Drummond's disciplinary meeting. By so doing, he inadvertently tips off the secret leader of the gang. Drummond and Smith are taken prisoner.

Gunns' girlfriend Molly (Peggy Evans) convinces him to go ahead with the latest planned robbery, enough to set them up for life, despite the police having been put on alert by Drummond. She masquerades as Smith to give phony information to Longworth to pass along to the police regarding the target of the theft. Afterward, Longworth is tied up as well.

The gang steals £500,000 in gold being delivered by aeroplane. Drummond is able to overpower the guard and his friends before the gang returns. He knocks out Gunns (who has locked up and gassed his unsuspecting confederates nearly to death to avoid sharing the loot). Webson shows up and holds Drummond at gunpoint; he explains he got into the racket because civilian life turned out to be unbearably boring. The police arrive just in time and take him into custody.

Cast 
 Walter Pidgeon as Hugh "Bulldog" Drummond
 Margaret Leighton as Sergeant Helen Smith
 Robert Beatty as Arthur Gunns
 David Tomlinson as Algenon "Algy" Longworth
 Peggy Evans as Molly
 Charles Victor as Inspector McIver
 Bernard Lee as Colonel Webson
 James Hayter as Bill, a friend of Drummond's
 Patric Doonan as Alec  
 Laurence Naismith as Hardcastle, Card player
 Richard Caldicot as Judge 
 Richard Johnson as Control Tower Operator

Reception
According to MGM records the film earned $372,000 in the US and Canada and $517,000 elsewhere, resulting in a loss of $1,052,000.

Notes

External links 
 
 
 
 

Films based on Bulldog Drummond
1951 films
British mystery films
1951 crime drama films
Films directed by Victor Saville
British black-and-white films
Films set in 1951
Metro-Goldwyn-Mayer films
British crime drama films
Films set in London
Films shot at MGM-British Studios
1950s English-language films
1950s British films